The  Eastern League season began on approximately April 1 and the regular season ended on approximately September 1. 

The Binghamton Mets defeated the Harrisburg Senators 3 games to 1 to win the Eastern League Championship Series.

Regular season

Standings

Notes:
Green shade indicates that team advanced to the playoffs
Bold indicates that team advanced to ELCS
Italics indicates that team won ELCS

Playoffs

Divisional Series

Northern Division
The Binghamton Mets defeated the New Haven Ravens in the Northern Division playoffs 3 games to 0.

Southern Division
The Harrisburg Senators defeated the Bowie Baysox in the Southern Division playoffs 3 games to 2.

Championship series
The Binghamton Mets defeated the Harrisburg Senators in the ELCS 3 games to 1.

References

External links
1994 Eastern League Review at thebaseballcube.com

Eastern League seasons